Hermeneric was a Suevic King of Galicia according to a now lost document described by the priest Antonio de Yepes. According to Yepes, the king reigned around 485, which falls within a century-long period (469–c.560) of obscurity during which the Sueves were predominantly Arian Christians. Hermeneric was said to be a destroyer of churches and persecutor of Catholic Christians.

Sources

Arias, Jorge C. "Identity and Interactions: The Suevi and the Hispano-Romans." University of Virginia: Spring 2007.

5th-century Suebian kings